Bob and Mike Bryan were the defending champions, but lost in the first round to Ivo Karlović and Frank Moser.  It marked the first time the Bryan brothers lost in the first round of a Grand Slam tournament since the 2001 Australian Open, a span of 42 Grand Slam tournaments, and their first opening round loss at the US Open since 1999.

Jürgen Melzer and Philipp Petzschner won the title, defeating the Polish team of Mariusz Fyrstenberg and Marcin Matkowski in the final, 6–2, 6–2.

Seeds

Draw

Finals

Top half

Section 1

Section 2

Bottom half

Section 3

Section 4

References

External links
 Main Draw
2011 US Open – Men's draws and results at the International Tennis Federation

Men's Doubles
US Open - Men's Doubles
US Open (tennis) by year – Men's doubles